Gaston IV may refer to:

 Gaston IV, Viscount of Béarn (died in 1131)
 Gaston IV, Count of Foix (1422–1472)